Mārtiņš Skirmants born December 7, 1977 in Rīga, Latvia is a former Latvian professional basketball player who played the Center position.

Playing career
Mārtiņš Skirmants started playing basketball in Daugavpils, but later on he moved to Rīga, where he started his pro career.

Skirmants spent most of his career playing for LBL clubs. He won seven LBL championships: one with Brocēni (1998), five with BK Ventspils (2002-2006) and one with Barons (2010). Skirmants excelled at shot blocking, which was his strength on defense.

He was part of Latvian National Team at EuroBasket 2005.

Pro clubs
1997-01:  ASK/Brocēni/LMT
2001-06:  BK Ventspils
2006-07:  Barons LMT
2007-09:  BK Ventspils
2009-10:  BC Goverla
2010-11:  Barons LMT

References

External links
FIBA Europe Profile
Eurocup Profile

1977 births
Living people
Latvian men's basketball players
Basketball players from Riga
BK Ventspils players
Centers (basketball)